That Hagen Girl is a 1947 American drama film directed by Peter Godfrey.  The screenplay by Charles Hoffman was based on the novel by Edith Kneipple Roberts.  The film focuses on small-town teenaged girl Mary Hagen (Shirley Temple), whom gossips believe is the illegitimate daughter of former resident and lawyer Tom Bates (Ronald Reagan). Lois Maxwell received a Golden Globe award for her performance.

Plot
Mary Hagen is believed by town gossips to be the illegitimate daughter of Tom Bates, a former resident and lawyer. She is often treated badly. Bates moves back into town and begins a friendship with Hagen's favorite teacher Julia Kane (Maxwell).  Hints are dropped that Bates is the real father of Hagen, though she is later revealed to be an orphan adopted by the Hagens. When the teacher leaves town, she suggests to Bates that he stop playing Hagen's father, as it has become clear that he is in love with her and that Mary unknowingly feels the same. Ultimately, Bates and Hagen board a train out of town after getting married.

Cast
 Shirley Temple as Mary Hagen
 Ronald Reagan as Tom Bates
 Rory Calhoun as Ken Freneau
 Conrad Janis as Dewey Koons
 Lois Maxwell as Julia Kane
 Dorothy Peterson as Minta Hagen 
 Charles Kemper as Jim Hagen 
 Penny Edwards as Christine Delaney 
 Jean Porter as Sharon Bailey 
 Harry Davenport as Judge A. Merrivale 
 Nella Walker as Molly Freneau 
 Winifred Harris as Selma Delaney 
 Moroni Olsen as Trenton Gateley 
 Frank Conroy as Dr. Stone 
 Kathryn Card as Miss Grover
 Jack Mower as Gossip (uncredited)

Production
Reagan considered it his least-liked role.  In her autobiography, Temple confirms that Reagan apparently detested his role and that it was a very difficult period in his life. After multiple retakes of a scene in which Reagan's character rescues Temple's character from a suicide attempt by jumping into a river during a storm, Reagan collapsed. He was hospitalized in Cedars of Lebanon Hospital with viral pneumonia.

Almost all prints of the film mysteriously disappeared from various film storage facilities and television stations as Ronald Reagan was becoming a prominent political figure.  The film resurfaced in the 1990s with showings on Turner Classic Movies.

Critical reception
In one scene, Temple attempts suicide. A critic wrote that it was too bad the attempt failed.

The New York Times thought the script amateurish and of Reagan and Temple wrote, "Ronald Reagan keeps as straight a face as he can while doing what must have struck him as the silliest job of his career ... but it is poor, little put-upon Shirley who looks most ridiculous through it all. She acts with the mopish dejection of a school-child who has just been robbed of a two-scoop ice cream cone."

The film was included in the popular 1978 book The Fifty Worst Films of All Time.

Box office
According to Warner Bros. records, the film earned $1,818,000 domestically and $301,000 foreign.

Awards
Lois Maxwell earned a Golden Globe Award (Most Promising Newcomer: Female) for her performance in the film.

See also
 Ronald Reagan filmography
 Shirley Temple filmography

References

External links

 
 
 
 
 
 

1947 films
1947 drama films
American black-and-white films
American drama films
Films based on American novels
Films directed by Peter Godfrey
Films scored by Franz Waxman
Films set in Ohio
Warner Bros. films
1940s English-language films
1940s American films